Firmino is a surname and given name, the Portuguese form of Firmin.

Surname
 Cândido Firmino de Mello-Leitão (1886–1948), Brazilian zoologist
 Émerson Luiz Firmino (born 1973), Brazilian footballer
 Roberto Firmino (born 1991), Brazilian footballer

Given name or maternal family name
 Osvaldinho (born 1945), real name Firmino Baleizão da Graça Sardinha, Portuguese footballer
 Diego Monar Firmino Martins (born 1989), Brazilian footballer
 Leandro Firmino da Hora (born 1978), Brazilian actor
 Paul J. F. Lusaka (1935–1996), Zambian politician and diplomat
 Samuel Firmino de Jesus (born 1986), Brazilian footballer

See also
 Firmino Alves, a municipality in the state of Bahia in Brazil
 Senador Firmino, a Brazilian municipality located in the state of Minas Gerais

References